The 2011 BBL Champions Cup was the sixth edition of the super cup game in German basketball, and was played on October 1, 2011. The game was played in the Brose Arena in Bamberg.

Match

References

BBL Champions Cup
Champions Cup